The Munsu Funfair() was an amusement park located in Pyongyang, North Korea. Opened in 1984, the park was located near the Chongryu Bridge, and was across the Taedong River from the Rungnado May Day Stadium. It was renovated and renamed into Munsu Water Park in 2013.

Notes

See also 
 List of amusement parks in North Korea

External links 
 

Amusement parks opened in 1984
1984 establishments in North Korea
Amusement parks in Pyongyang